Andrzej Klimaszewski (born November 26, 1954) is a Polish sprint canoer who competed from the late 1970s to the mid-1980s. He won five medals in the K-4 10000 m at the ICF Canoe Sprint World Championships with three silvers (1978, 1979, 1981) and two bronzes (1977, 1983).

Klimaszewski competed in the K-2 1000 m event at the 1980 Summer Olympics in Moscow, but was eliminated in the repechagés.

References

Sports-reference.com profile

1954 births
Living people
Polish male canoeists
Canoeists at the 1980 Summer Olympics
Olympic canoeists of Poland
Sportspeople from Poznań
ICF Canoe Sprint World Championships medalists in kayak
20th-century Polish people